Vasyl Stepanovych Shpuk (born 16 February 1989) is a Ukrainian football goalkeeper who plays with Toronto Falcons in the Canadian Soccer League.

Club career

Europe 
Shpuk began his professional career in 2006 with FC Chornohora Ivano-Frankivsk in the Ukrainian Second League. He signed with FC Prykarpattya Ivano-Frankivsk, and helped the club achieve a promotion to the Ukrainian First League. In 2007, he signed with FC Naftovyk-Ukrnafta Okhtyrka of the Ukrainian Premier League. After failing to break into the senior team, he signed with Skala Stryi in 2010. 

In 2011, he played in the Ukrainian First League with FC Lviv. In his debut season in the second tier, he made 2 appearances with Lviv. The following season he returned to his former club Skala in the third tier. He would make 26 appearances for the club.

Shpuk returned to the country's top-tier league for the 2013-14 season with Karpaty Lviv. Once again he failed to make an appearance in the premier league due to miscommunications with the team administration. In late 2013, he had a trial session with FC Poltava.  

In early 2014, he went across the border to Poland to sign with Polonia Przemyśl of Liga III. Following his brief stint abroad he returned to the Ukrainian second tier by securing a deal with Nyva Ternopil. In the winter of 2015, he departed from the Ternopil. In total, he played in 12 matches for Nyva.

Canada 
After his release from Ternopil, he was linked with a move abroad to the Canadian Soccer League with Toronto Atomic. He would ultimately sign with Toronto for the 2015 season. He made his debut on May 9, 2015 against Niagara United. He helped Toronto secure a playoff berth by finishing fifth in the First Division. Toronto was eliminated in the opening round of the postseason by SC Waterloo Region. 

Shpuk would re-sign with Toronto for the 2016 season. Atomic once more secured a playoff spot where the Serbian White Eagles eliminated them from the competition in the first round. 

In 2022, he returned to the CSL to play with the expansion franchise Toronto Falcons.

References

External links 
 Profile on Official Website
 
 

1989 births
Living people
Ukrainian footballers
FC Naftovyk-Ukrnafta Okhtyrka players
FC Prykarpattia Ivano-Frankivsk (2004) players
FC Skala Stryi (2004) players
FC Lviv players
FC Karpaty Lviv players
FC Nyva Ternopil players
Toronto Atomic FC players
Ukrainian First League players
Canadian Soccer League (1998–present) players
Association football goalkeepers
Ukrainian Second League players
Sportspeople from Lviv Oblast
Polonia Przemyśl players
III liga players